Charles Sharpe may refer to:

Charles Sharpe (cricketer) (1851–1935), English amateur first-class cricketer
Charles Sharpe (politician) (born 1938), American politician
Charles Kirkpatrick Sharpe  (1781?–1851), Scottish antiquary and artist
Charles Richard Sharpe (1889–1963), English recipient of the Victoria Cross

See also
Charles Sharp (1848–1903), English cricketer
Charles Stewart Sharp, British businessman in Hong Kong in the early 1900s